Kai Ting Chuang (Chinese:庄凯婷, pinyin: zhuāng kǎi tíng), nicknamed Killer Bee, is a Taiwanese kickboxer. She is a former ONE Super Series Kickboxing Atomweight World Champion. She made her pro debut in 2014 in a shootboxing contest, but found her greatest success in the world of kickboxing.

Background 
Chuang’s parents divorced when she was just a baby, and her grandparents adopted her. When she began boxing in school, she lied to her grandmother so as not to be persuaded out of the sport.

Chuang began to box in the hopes of landing a university scholarship. As she excelled as a boxer, she completed her objective and attended the National Taiwan University of Sport. After just her freshman year, Chuang turned pro.

Now she trains out of Iron Boxing under the tutelage of former K-1 competitor Wang Chung Yaun.

Kickboxing career 
On August 2, 2014, Chuang competed at Shoot Boxing Girls S-Cup 2014. She would lose her debut by unanimous decision to Christina Jurjevic. She would return to shootboxing in 2015, but once again dropped a unanimous decision to Mio Tsumura.

After the setbacks in shootboxing, Chuang went back to her roots in kickboxing and Muay Thai where she found much greater success.

Chuang became a three-time WAKO kickboxing champion while compiling a record of 16–5.

Due to her success, Chuang was brought into ONE Championship to battle Thailand’s Yodcherry Sityodtong for the inaugural ONE Super Series Kickboxing Atomweight Championship. On July 7, 2018, Chuang defeated Yodcherry by unanimous decision to become a world champion.

On October 6, 2018, she defended the title against Stamp Fairtex. She would go on to lose the belt by unanimous decision.

On July 12, 2019, Chuang suffered her second consecutive defeat when she dropped a majority decision to Janet Todd at ONE Championship: Masters of Destiny.

Championships and accomplishments 

 ONE Championship
 ONE Atomweight Kickboxing World Championship (One time)

Fight record 

|-  style="background:#FFBBBB;"
| 2019-07-12|| Loss ||align=left| Janet Todd || ONE Championship: Masters of Destiny || Kuala Lumpur, Malaysia || Decision (Majority) || 3 ||3:00 
|-
|-  style="background:#FFBBBB;"
| 2018-10-06|| Loss ||align=left| Stamp Fairtex || ONE Championship: Kingdom of Heroes || Bangkok, Thailand || Decision (Unanimous) || 5 ||3:00 
|-
! style=background:white colspan=9 |
|-  style="background:#CCFFCC;"
| 2018-07-07|| Win ||align=left| Yodcherry Sityodtong || ONE Championship: Battle for the Heavens || Guangzhou, China || Decision (Unanimous) || 5 || 3:00 
|-
! style=background:white colspan=9 |
|-  bgcolor="#fbb"
| 2018-02-12|| Loss||align=left| Manazo Kobayashi || KNOCK OUT FIRST IMPACT || Tokyo, Japan || Decision (Majority) || 5 || 3:00
|-  bgcolor="#fbb"
| 2016-09-30|| Loss||align=left| KANA || Krush 69 || Tokyo, Japan ||KO (Kick) || 3 || 2:29
|-
! style=background:white colspan=9 |
|-  bgcolor="#cfc"
| 2016-01-17|| Win||align=left| Little Tiger || Krush 62 || Tokyo, Japan || Decision (Unanimous)  || 3 || 3:00
|-  style="background:#FFBBBB;"
| 2015-05-24|| Loss ||align=left| MIO || Onna Matsuri 2015: ~J-Girls x Shoot Boxing~ || Tokyo, Japan || Decision (Unanimous) || 3 || 3:00
|-
|-  style="background:#FFBBBB;"
| 2014-08-02|| Loss ||align=left| Christina Jurjevic || Shoot Boxing Girls S-Cup 2014 || Tokyo, Japan || Decision (Unanimous) || 3 || 2:00
|-
|-
| colspan=9 | Legend:

See also 

 List of current ONE fighters
 List of female kickboxers

References 

1995 births
Living people
Taiwanese female martial artists
Atomweight mixed martial artists
People from Changhua County
Female kickboxers
ONE Championship kickboxers
ONE Championship champions